Namtok Mae Surin National Park is a national park in Mae Hong Son Province, Thailand. Home to mountains, waterfalls and caves, the park is best known for its namesake Mae Surin waterfall.

Geography
Namtok Mae Surin National Park is located east of Mae Hong Son town in Mae Hong Son and Khun Yuam districts. The park's area is 247,875 rai ~ .

History
In 1981, Namtok Mae Surin was designated Thailand's 37th National Park.

Attractions
The park's main attraction is its namesake waterfall, Mae Surin, a single-tier waterfall  in height. Many of the park's streams eventually join the Pai River, which flows through the park. Nam Hu Haichai Cave is notable for being the site of a water jet erupting from the cave's interior walls at a regular interval of every 25 minutes.

Flora and fauna
Namtok Mae Surin features deciduous and dipterocarp forests and, in higher areas, pine forests. Tree species include Dipterocarpus alatus, Pinus merkusii, Terminalia bellirica and Pinus kesiya. The park is home to a rare and indigenous lady slipper orchid.

Animal species include Malayan sun bear, Asiatic black bear, serow, barking deer, lar gibbon, wild boar, python and cobra. Bird life includes drongo and hornbill.

Gallery

See also
List of national parks of Thailand
List of Protected Areas Regional Offices of Thailand

References

National parks of Thailand
Geography of Mae Hong Son province
Tourist attractions in Mae Hong Son province
1981 establishments in Thailand
Protected areas established in 1981